Mo is a 2016 Tamil horror comedy film written and directed by Bhuvan Nullan, with Aishwarya Rajesh, Suresh Ravi, Ramesh Thilak, Darbuka Siva and Ramdoss in the leading roles, while Pooja Devariya, Selva, and Mime Gopi play supporting roles. The film was edited by Gopinath with music composed by Santhosh Dhayanidhi. The film, featuring a new technical crew, began production during 2015 and released on 30 December 2016.

Plot

Vetri (Selva), a real estate businessman, plans to buy an old school in Pondicherry to establish a new resort there. Another opponent businessman Senthil Nathan (Mime Gopi) has more of a chance of finishing the final deal. Senthil's horoscope says that he should never own a haunted property, and he has a fear of ghosts.

Dev (Suresh Ravi), Sathish (Ramesh Thilak), and Kumar (Darbuka Siva) are childhood friends who have been involved in cheating practices for money from childhood. They discover a new idea to cheat people using their fear of ghosts. Priya (Aishwarya Rajesh), a junior film artist who dreams of becoming a heroine someday, and Joseph Chellappa (Ramdoss), a film makeup artist, join the three. Priya acts as the ghost, and Joseph does her makeup. Priya does this to make her brother Gautham (Saran) continue his schooling. Dev, Sathish, and Kumar act as exorcists.

One day, the five plans to cheat Vetri but get trapped. Vetri assigns them a task to do the same ghost drama in the school in Pondicherry in order to make Senthil drop his plan of buying the property. They accept the deal and go to Pondicherry. They do all sorts of paranormal activities, and Senthil's men believe that the school is haunted. However, they themselves feel certain abnormal things happening around them. The next day, Vetri tells them about Senthil's visit to the school at night. Priya does not accompany them as she falls sick. All the boys reach the school. This time, Chellappa acts as the ghost, and they do the paranormal activities again. After Senthil runs, they themselves again feel the same activities and hear a hiccup sound. All four run out of the school and reach their rooms; they find that Priya has gone to the school in search of them.

They go to the school to rescue Priya and find her possessed by a ghost. They find her in a horror look scribbling on the board. They seek the help of a priest in the nearby church. He gives them holy water and a bible. They read the bible and throw the holy water on the ghost-obsessed Priya. The ghost calms down and tells them that she is Mohanavadhani alias Mo (Pooja Devariya), who always dreamed of becoming a math teacher. When her dreams came true, she died out of continuous hiccups on the first day of her class as a teacher. She wants her unfulfilled dream of teaching math. She makes all four men sit and teaches them math. Finally, Mo's spirit leaves Priya’s body, tired of teaching the four dumb men.

The movie ends with the school successfully being sold by Vetri, Priya becoming the heroine of a ghost film, and Chellapa being her makeup man. However, Dev, Sathish, and Kumar continue cheating people.

Cast

 Aishwarya Rajesh as Priya
 Suresh Ravi as Dev
 Ramesh Thilak as Sathish
 Darbuka Siva as Kumar 
 Ramdoss as Joseph Chellappa
 Pooja Devariya as Mo (Mohanavadhani)
 Selva as Vetri
 Mime Gopi as Senthil Nathan
 Yogi Babu as Pazhani
 Saran Shakthi as Gautham
 Nandagopal MK as Virgin boy
 Supergood Subramani

Production
Bhuvan Nullan launched the film in early 2015 and signed Aishwarya Rajesh and Suresh Ravi to play the lead roles. The film was extensively shot across the suburbs of Chennai and was revealed to be complete by January 2016.

Release 
Mo released on December 30, 2016.

Soundtrack
The soundtrack was composed by Santhosh Dhayanidhi, who had earlier composed the Santhanam-starrer Inimey Ippadithan. The film has only one song.

References

External links
 

2016 films
2010s Tamil-language films
Indian comedy horror films
2016 comedy horror films